Paignton Pier is a pleasure pier in the large English seaside resort of Paignton, Devon. It was financed by Arthur Hyde Dendy, a local Paignton barrister and designed by George Soudon Bridgman.

History 
The Paignton Pier Act received Royal Assent on 3 June 1874 and work commenced on its construction in October 1878 to the design of Bridgman.

The  pier, with its customary grand pavilion at the seaward end, was opened to the public for the first time in June 1879. The pier-head pavilion was home to many forms of entertainment including singing, dancing, recitals, music hall, and most famously Gilbert and Sullivan's comic opera, re-titled HMS Pinafore on the water, performed by Mr D'Oyley's full company on 27 and 28 July 1880. In 1881 the pier-head was enlarged to facilitate the construction of a billiard room, adjoining the pavilion.

On the death of Arthur Dendy Paignton Pier was purchased by the Devon Dock, Pier and Steamship Company, under whose ownership it became a regular stop for paddle steamers travelling between Torquay and Brixham. In 1919 the pier-head and its associated buildings were destroyed in a fire. These were never replaced and a period of decline followed. Sectioned as a defence measure in 1940, for fear of German invasion, the damaged neck was eventually repaired once hostilities had ceased.

In 1980 the fortunes of Paignton Pier took a turn for the better when a major redevelopment project was undertaken. This included the widening of the shoreward end to ensure a uniform neck, and the construction of the rather stylish pavilions that remain today. Paignton Pier comprises an entrance building at the shoreward end along with what looks to be several individual pavilion buildings connected along the neck. These in fact form one single amusement arcade through their entire length. At the pier-head there is now an open amusement area containing karts, slides and a carousel.

References

External links
 Official site

Piers in Devon
Buildings and structures in Paignton